Elewijt is a village in the municipality of Zemst, Flemish Brabant, Belgium.

History

Roman period 

The village was first founded in the 1st century as a Roman vicus on a junction of roads. It kept existing until it was destroyed at the end of the third century. Hundreds of years later, a new village slowly began to arise, with the center half a mile to the south of the ruins of the old village.

post-Roman period 
Throughout most of the late Middle Ages, Elewijt and the nearby village of Perk formed a Herrschaft (territory) herrschaft. In the 11th century, a wooden fort was built in the southwestern part of the village. Later the Elewijt Castle (Het Steen) was modernised and in the 1630s it was a residence of the famous painter Pieter Paul Rubens.

Monuments 
Elewijt contains the castle of Het Steen, which was owned by Peter Paul Rubens from 1635 to his death in 1640, and featured in some of his paintings.

Populated places in Flemish Brabant
Nervii